Walt Speck (August 29, 1896 – October 11, 1979) was an American painter. His work was part of the painting event in the art competition at the 1932 Summer Olympics.

References

1896 births
1979 deaths
20th-century American painters
American male painters
Olympic competitors in art competitions
Artists from Detroit
20th-century American male artists